Eucalyptus indurata, commonly known as ironbark or ironbark mallee, is a species of tree or mallee that is endemic to southern Western Australia. It has rough, hard, blackish, furrowed bark on the trunk, smooth whitish bark above, lance-shaped adult leaves, flower buds in groups of seven, white to pale yellow flowers and shortened spherical fruit.

Description
It has rough, hard, furrowed, blackish bark similar to that of an ironbark on some or all of the trunk, smooth whitish bark above. It blooms between June and September producing white to pale yellow flowers.

Taxonomy and naming
Eucalyptus indurata was first formally described by the botanists Ian Brooker and Stephen Hopper in 1993 in the journal Nuytsia from a specimen collected near Dalyup in 1983. The specific epithet (indurata) is from the Latin induratus, 'hard', referring to the hard, rough bark of this species.

Distribution and habitat
Ironbark is found on undulating plains and rises along the south coast from near Ravensthorpe to Balladonia in the Coolgardie, Esperance Plains, Mallee and Nullarbor biogeographic regions where it grows in yellow sandy-clay soils.

Conservation status
This eucalypt is classified as "not threatened" by the Western Australian Government Department of Parks and Wildlife.

See also

List of Eucalyptus species

References

Eucalypts of Western Australia
Trees of Australia
indurata
Myrtales of Australia
Plants described in 1993
Taxa named by Ian Brooker
Taxa named by Stephen Hopper